Raphael Gregório Guzzo (born 6 January 1995) is a Portuguese professional footballer who plays as a midfielder for F.C. Vizela.

Club career

Benfica
Guzzo was born in São Paulo, Brazil, moving to Portugal before his tenth birthday and starting playing football with Associação Desportiva Flaviense. In 2008, the 13-year-old joined S.L. Benfica's youth system.

On 6 January 2013, still a junior, Guzzo made his professional debut with the latter's reserve team, starting in a 1–1 home draw against C.D. Santa Clara in the Segunda Liga. He scored his first goal in the competition the following month, contributing to a 4–1 home win over C.F. União.

On 30 August 2014, Guzzo was loaned to second tier club G.D. Chaves in a season-long deal. The following 10 August, still owned by Benfica, he signed with C.D. Tondela, but the loan was terminated on 28 January 2016. His maiden appearance in the Primeira Liga with the latter took place on 14 August 2015, when he came on as a late substitute for Luís Machado in a 1–2 home loss to Sporting CP.

Reus
On 31 August 2016, Guzzo joined Spanish Segunda División side CF Reus Deportiu. His first match in the competition took place on 22 September, when he played 19 minutes in a 1–0 away win against Real Oviedo.

Guzzo returned to his adopted homeland on 16 August 2018, being loaned to F.C. Famalicão for one year. He played 13 times as they won promotion to the top flight as runners-up, and scored in a 3–1 defeat of former team Benfica B on 20 April 2019.

Vizela
On 2 August 2019, Guzzo returned to Chaves as a free agent and agreed to a two-year contract. In February 2021, however, he moved to F.C. Vizela also in division two on a deal until June 2022. He scored six goals until the end of that season in only 15 matches, helping the latter return to the top tier after 36 years.

Guzzo put pen to paper to a one-year extension on 7 July 2021. He scored his first top-flight goal the following 22 January to equalise in a 3–2 win on his return to Tondela, adding another eight days later in a victory by the same score at home to Vitória de Guimarães.

International career
Guzzo represented Portugal at the 2014 UEFA European Under-19 Championship. Also with his adopted nation, he took part in the 2015 FIFA U-20 World Cup, scoring his team's first goal in the 2–1 victory over New Zealand in the round of 16.

Club statistics

References

External links

1995 births
Living people
Portuguese people of Brazilian descent
Brazilian emigrants to Portugal
Brazilian footballers
Portuguese footballers
Footballers from São Paulo
Association football midfielders
Primeira Liga players
Liga Portugal 2 players
S.L. Benfica B players
G.D. Chaves players
C.D. Tondela players
F.C. Famalicão players
F.C. Vizela players
Segunda División players
CF Reus Deportiu players
Portugal youth international footballers
Portugal under-21 international footballers
Brazilian expatriate footballers
Portuguese expatriate footballers
Expatriate footballers in Spain
Brazilian expatriate sportspeople in Spain
Portuguese expatriate sportspeople in Spain